Markus Schupp (born 7 January 1966) is a German football manager and former player.

Playing career
Born in Idar-Oberstein, Rhineland-Palatinate, Schupp started playing professionally in 1984 at 1. FC Kaiserslautern, where he won the German Cup in 1990 and the league title in 1991. He went on to play over 150 matches for the club over seven years before joining SG Wattenscheid 09 in July 1991. He played at Wattenscheid for just one season, but he was so impressive during that time that it led to him being signed by FC Bayern Munich in the Summer of 1992. At Bayern, he was a first-team regular and helped the club win the 1994 Bundesliga title and two Fuji-Cups, in 1994 and 1995. He then moved to Eintracht Frankfurt in 1995 where he had moderate personal success but won no major honours as he left the club after just one season to play for Hamburger SV. He was by no means a first-team regular at Hamburg and was sent on short loan spell in Switzerland in 1997. 

Schupp joined FC Basel's first team for the second half of their 1996–97 FC Basel season under coach Karl Engel. Schupp played his domestic league debut for the club in the home game in the St. Jakob Stadium on 23 March 1997 as Basel were defeated 0–1 by Sion. He scored his first goal for his club on 29 March home game against Servette in the Swiss Cup. Schupp's goal was scored 79th minute from the penalty point. but only a few minutes later Schupp scored an own goal and Basel were defeated 1–4 and so eliminated from the competition. During this time the team suffered six defeats in a row and head-coach Karl Engel was fired and was replaced by Heinz Hermann. The football did not improve and after just a few weeks Hermann was replaced by Salvatore Andracchio. For Schupp this was not a good time either, he played in only seven games for Basel, scoring just that one goal. Six of these games were in the Nationalliga A and one in the Swiss Cup. All seven of these games ended with a defeat.

Later that year, he signed for SK Sturm Graz of Austria and retired in 2001, having played 128 league games for the club.

Coaching career
After his retirement from playing, he managed SV Wacker Burghausen from 2004 until 2006 and was assistant manager to Huub Stevens at Hamburger SV during the 2007–08 season. On 22 April 2009, he signed a contract with FC Red Bull Salzburg as assistant coach and signed then on 3 September 2009 a contract as head coach of Karlsruher SC until 30 June 2011.

Honours
1. FC Kaiserslautern
 Bundesliga: 1990–91
 DFB-Pokal: 1989–90

Bayern Munich
 Bundesliga: 1993–94

References

Sources
 Rotblau: Jahrbuch Saison 2017/2018. Publisher: FC Basel Marketing AG. 
 Die ersten 125 Jahre. Publisher: Josef Zindel im Friedrich Reinhardt Verlag, Basel. 
 Verein "Basler Fussballarchiv" Homepage

1966 births
Living people
German footballers
Association football midfielders
Germany under-21 international footballers
1. FC Kaiserslautern II players
1. FC Kaiserslautern players
SG Wattenscheid 09 players
FC Bayern Munich footballers
Eintracht Frankfurt players
Hamburger SV players
FC Basel players
SK Sturm Graz players
Bundesliga players
Swiss Super League players
Austrian Football Bundesliga players
German football managers
SV Wacker Burghausen managers
Karlsruher SC managers
2. Bundesliga managers
German expatriate footballers
German expatriate sportspeople in Switzerland
Expatriate footballers in Switzerland
German expatriate sportspeople in Austria
Expatriate footballers in Austria
Footballers from Rhineland-Palatinate
West German footballers